The basic annual salary of a Member Of Parliament (MP) in the House of Commons is £84,144, as of April 2022. In addition, MPs are able to claim allowances to cover the costs of running an office and employing staff, and maintaining a constituency residence or a residence in London. Additional salary is paid for appointments or additional duties, such as ministerial appointments, being a whip, chairing a select committee or chairing a Public Bill committee.

The Independent Parliamentary Standards Authority was introduced in response to the parliamentary expenses scandal that broke in 2009.

Salary and benefits: Commons

Basic salary
The basic annual salary of an MP in the House of Commons is £84,144.

Historical salaries 

Members of parliament were unpaid until 1911, as it was assumed they had independent means, which restricted membership of Parliament to persons who were well-off. There had been attempts since the late 18th century to provide salaries. The Labour Party pressed for MPs to be paid, allowing men and women from 1918 who could not afford to serve unpaid to become Members of Parliament.

The first regular salary was £400 per year, introduced in 1911. For comparison, average annual earnings were £70 in 1908. Some subsequent salary levels were £1,000 in 1946, £3,250 in 1964, £11,750 in 1980, and £26,701 in 1990. The increases in MPs' basic salaries since 1996 have been:

In December 2013, the Independent Parliamentary Standards Authority recommended that pay be increased to £74,000 per annum, linked "to the pay of the people they represent". At the same time, pension benefits would be reduced, resettlement payments scrapped and expenses tightened. In July 2015, this was implemented (backdated to 8 May 2015, the day after the general election), with annual changes now "linked to changes in average earnings in the public sector".

Additional salary

Many MPs (the Prime Minister, ministers, the Speaker, senior opposition leaders, opposition chief whip, etc.) receive a supplementary salary for their specific responsibilities. As of 1 April 2015, these additional entitlements ranged from £15,025 for Select Committee Chairs to £79,990 for the Prime Minister. On 24 May 2015 David Cameron announced that he intended to freeze ministerial pay for the next five years.

Salary of the Prime Minister 

The Prime Minister does not always claim the total amount entitled to in legislation. The Prime Minister is entitled to other benefits, including the use of the Prime Minister's apartment at 10 Downing Street, the country house Chequers, and other official residences, and chauffeur-driven transport.

The Prime Minister's salary figures below include the salary for being an MP.

Pension 
MPs normally receive a pension of either 1/40th or 1/50th of their final pensionable salary for each year of pensionable service depending on the contribution rate they chose. Members who made contributions of 13.75% of their salary gain an accrual rate of 1/40th.

If an MP stands down during the course of a Parliament due to ill health, an ill health retirement grant is payable, calculated in the same way as the Resettlement Grant (as well as an immediate pension based on the service the MP would have accrued if they had continued to serve until age 65).

Resettlement Grant and Winding-up Allowance
On leaving the House of Commons, an MP will be entitled to what is essentially severance pay.

Resettlement Grant

The Resettlement Grant is the name given to MPs' severance pay package. It may be claimed to help former MPs with the costs of adjusting to life outside parliament. It is payable to any Member who ceases to be an MP at a general election. The amount is based on age and length of service, and varies between 50% and 100% of the annual salary payable to a Member of Parliament at the time of the dissolution.

In the UK the first £30,000 of severance pay is tax-free. As stated above, the amount retiring MPs, or those who lose their seats receive, depends on how old they are and how long they have served in the House. For example, an MP who stays in office for one term (say 5 years) and then leaves office will currently receive tax-free severance pay of 50% of their current salary, or £32,383 at 2009 rates – equivalent to an annual salary increment of over £12,000 at current tax rates and pay scales.

From the start of the 2015 Parliament, a "Loss of Office Payment", at double the statutory redundancy payment, was introduced. "For the 'average' MP, who leaves office with 11 years' service, this may lead to a payment of around £14,850."

Winding-up Allowance

An allowance is available (up to £46,000 as of July 2011) to pay for winding up staff contracts and office rent. An allowance of up to one third of the annual Office Costs Allowance was paid for the reimbursement of the cost of any work on parliamentary business undertaken on behalf of a deceased, defeated or retiring member after the date of cessation of membership. On 5 July 2001 the House agreed to change the allowance to one third of the sum of the staffing provision and Incidental Expenses Allowance in force at the time of cessation of membership.

Summer recess 
Parliament takes a break of around 45 days for the summer. This is not only for holiday, but so that MPs can spend more time away from Parliament in their constituencies to do work there.

Expenses 

In addition to the above benefits, PMs can claim for the reimbursement of expenses incurred as a result of their duties. They are entitled to money

Office expenses 

Office running costs
Staffing costs
Travel for staff
Centrally purchased stationery
Postage costs
Central IT costs
Communications allowance

MPs are entitled to claim £9,000 a year for postage and stationery (financial year 2015–16).  This amount is in addition to any stationery and postage costs which Members may have reimbursed under the Independent Parliamentary Standards Authority's expenses Scheme.

During the COVID-19 pandemic MPs were able to claim additional expenses of up to £10,000 to support the costs of them and their staff working from home.

Housing, second home, and travel 
MPs receive allowances towards having somewhere to live in London and in their constituency, and travelling between Parliament and their constituency.

Salary and benefits: House of Lords
Members of the House of Lords are not salaried. They can opt to receive a £332 per day attendance allowance, plus travel expenses and subsidised restaurant facilities. Peers may also choose to receive a reduced attendance allowance of £166 per day instead.

Scrutiny and audit process of claims

In 2010, following the parliamentary expenses scandal, the payment of MPs' salaries and allowances, and many staff, was moved from the Fees Office, which was effectively self-policing by MPs of their expenses, to a more autonomous body, the Independent Parliamentary Standards Authority. In 2010 the IPSA was also given the responsibility of setting MPs' salary levels. It is accountable to the Speaker's Committee for the IPSA, comprising the Speaker, the Leader of the House, the Chair of the Standards and Privileges Committee and five MPs selected by the Speaker (one of whom is the Shadow Leader of the House).

The National Audit Office, another independent parliamentary body, has some audit authority.

See also
 The Green Book (UK Parliament)
 List of salaries of heads of state and government
 Ministerial and Other Salaries Act 1975

References

External links
 Members’ pay and expenses and ministerial salaries 2019/20

House of Commons of the United Kingdom
Salaries of office-holders
UK members of parliament